The Duchy of Drutsk was a small appanage principality of the Polotsk principality and was centred in Drutsk. It was located on a three way stick between Vitebsk, Minsk and Mogilev regions in modern Belarus.

The appanage duchy of Drutsk was established after the death of Vseslav, the Prince of Polotsk, in 1101 and the division of the Polatsk territory between Vseslav's sons. Drutsk was given to Rogvolod-Boris. Soon its territory was taken over by another appanage duchy of Polotsk, Duchy of Minsk governed by Gleb Vseslavich. In 1116, the duchy of Drutsk was taken over by the Grand Duchy of Kiev governed by Volodymyr Monomakh, but by 1150s it was returned to Duchy of Minsk. Eventually Drutsk was entirely taken over by the Principality of Minsk in the second half of the 13th century and in early 14th century by another appanage duchy of Polotsk, Principality of Vitebsk.

It is believed that Algirdas, Grand Duke of Lithuania, acquired the Duchy by marriage to Maria of Vitebsk. The Duchy became part of the Grand Duchy of Lithuania where it existed as an autonomous principality until an administrative reform in 1565–1566, when it was included into the Orsha county of Vitebsk Voivodeship.

Princes of Drutsk 
 1151–1158: Gleb of Drutsk, son of prince Rostislav of Minsk
 1101–1119: Boris I of Polotzk, son of grand-prince Vseslav of Kiev
 1140–1146: Rogvolod II of Polotzk, son of Boris I
 1146–1151: Gleb of Drutsk, son of Rogvolod II
 from 1163: Gleb of Drutsk, son of Rogvolod II
 1161–1171: Rogvolod II of Polotzk (again)
 until 1196: Boris of Drutsk, son of Gleb
 about 1217: Vojtech of Drutsk, son of prince Boris II of Polotzk

References 

States and territories established in 1101
Medieval Belarus
Principalities of the Grand Duchy of Lithuania
Subdivisions of Kievan Rus'